Neah-Kah-Nie High School is a public high school located in Rockaway Beach, Oregon, United States. It is part of the Neah-Kah-Nie School District. Neahkahnie Mountain is only 12 miles north of the school. In 2017 construction on a new track and concession stand was completed.

Academics
In 2008, 82% of the school's seniors received a high school diploma. Of 60 students, 49 graduated, seven dropped out, and four were still in high school in 2009.

Activities
In 2010, the school's team placed sixth in the national National Ocean Sciences Bowl, held in Florida.

References

External links
  

High schools in Tillamook County, Oregon
Public high schools in Oregon